The 2007 Blue Angels South Carolina crash occurred on April 21, 2007, when the Number 6 US Navy Blue Angels jet crashed during the final minutes of an air show at the Marine Corps Air Station Beaufort in Beaufort, South Carolina. The sole fatality was the pilot, Lieutenant Commander Kevin "Kojak" Davis. The body of the pilot and the flight recorder were recovered and moved to the local coroner's office.
Eight nearby residents were injured and millions of dollars worth of private property damage were caused by flying debris.

A report was released on January 15, 2008, ending the investigation by the Navy into the crash. The report states that when LCDR Davis pulled back into a 6.8-g pull, he lost control of the aircraft due to G-force-induced Loss Of Consciousness (G-LOC).

Accident

All six McDonnell Douglas F/A-18 Hornets of the Blue Angels were making their final turns into the landing pattern when Lt. Cmdr. Davis, piloting Blue Angel #6, became disoriented by the G-forces of the turn. His airplane flew behind the audience and low over a tree-line, three miles away from air show center. The aircraft slid for two hundred to three hundred yards after it hit the ground. This was followed by a plume of black smoke, which Blue Angel #1 immediately began to circle while the others landed. Several rescue helicopters and local emergency vehicles went to the crash site in response to 9-1-1 calls.

Aftermath
The Blue Angels returned to their home base at Naval Air Station Pensacola, Florida, to discuss continuing their season. Sunday's air show went on as planned but, in a special tribute, the GEICO Skytypers flew the missing man formation in honor of the fallen Blue Angel.

Soon after LCDR Davis’ crash, the Blue Angels began performing a five-jet demonstration.  The squadron called back former Blue Angel, LCDR Craig Olson, to fill the opposing solo position. LCDR Olson had previously served with the squadron from 2003 to 2005, during which time he flew both solo positions.

See also
 List of air show accidents and incidents

References

External links
Pre-accident pictures of the aircraft
Report information issued by the Pensacola Journal
JAG Manual Investigation Basic Report Redacted Copy

Blue Angels South Carolina crash, 2007
Blue Angels South Carolina crash, 2007
Disasters in South Carolina
Accidental deaths in South Carolina
Beaufort County, South Carolina
Blue Angels
Aviation accidents and incidents in South Carolina
April 2007 events in the United States